The 2006–07 Japan Figure Skating Championships were the 75th edition of the event. They were held between December 27 and 29, 2006 at the Rainbow Ice Arena in Nagoya. Skaters competed in the disciplines of men's singles, ladies' singles, and ice dancing on the senior level. This event was used to determine the teams for the 2007 World Championships and the 2007 Four Continents Championships. The level of competition is senior-level only. Juniors compete at the Japan Junior Figure Skating Championships, where the top three advance to the 2007 World Junior Championships.

Competition notes
 The following skaters placed high enough at Junior Nationals and so were invited to compete at Nationals: Tatsuki Machida, Takahito Mura, and Hirofumi Torii for men, and Nana Takeda, Rumi Suizu, and Satsuki Muramoto for ladies.

Results

Men

Ladies

Ice dancing

Japan Junior Figure Skating Championships
The 2006–07 Japan Junior Figure Skating Championships took place between November 26 and 27, 2006 in Hiroshima.

Men

Ladies

Pairs

Ice dancing

International team selections

World Championships

Four Continents Championships

External links
 2006–07 Japan Figure Skating Championships results
 2006–07 Japan Junior Figure Skating Championships results 

Japan Figure Skating Championships
2006 in figure skating
2007 in figure skating
2006 in Japanese sport